is a town in Shimajiri District, Okinawa Prefecture, Japan. It is located at the southern end of Okinawa Island, on the east coast, overlooking Nakagusuku Bay.

As of 2015, the town has a population of 18,410 and a population density of 3,502 persons per km2. The total area is 5.18 km2, making it the second smallest municipality in Okinawa.

History

References to the area represented by the modern town of Yonabaru may be found in the Omoro Sōshi, which makes mention of "Yonaharu" and "Yonaha-bama".

Formerly part of Ōzato Magiri, with the abolition of the magiri in 1908, the area of Yonabaru became part of Ōzato Village. A railway line to Naha opened in 1914 and with it came a period of economic growth. Talk during the early Shōwa period of separate municipal status was interrupted by the Pacific War and the foundation of Yonabaru Town had to wait until 1 April 1949.

Demographics

Neighbouring Municipalities
Nanjō
Nishihara
Haebaru

References

External links
  Yonabaru Town (homepage)

Towns in Okinawa Prefecture